Raaj-The Showman is a 2009 Kannada language drama film starring Puneeth Rajkumar and Priyanka Kothari, who made her debut in Kannada films with Ramnitu chaudhary in the guest appearance The film was directed by Prem.

Plot
Muththuraj aka Raj, who stays happily with his parents in a village aspires to be an actor like Dr. Rajkumar. He promises his mother that he will be a great actor like Rajkumar. He arrives at the city and become a junior artist in films. A wannabe director, who has full confidence in his talents starts his new film with Raj in the lead role. But the film's actress Parvathy walks out. Sensing that his chance to become an actor will be under a threat, Raj starts pestering Paaru to work with him where she develops feelings for him. Paaru learns that her two relatives, who are actually Bangalore Underworld gangsters are fighting against each other to marry her.

She is forced to escape with Raj. The director decide to shelve the film after Paaru's relatives threaten them. Upset, Raj reveals his past and his promise to his mother to the director. The director realizes and supports Raj's decision and begins the shooting of the film, along with Paaru. They complete the film's shooting with only the climax remaining, Paaru's relatives arrive to take away Paaru, but Raj stops them and Paaru profess her love to Raj, who agrees and a combat ensues where Raj makes Paaru's relatives realize their mistake, who leave. The film is released and becomes a Blockbuster at the box office. Having realized his dream, Raj and Paaru leave for Raj's village and Raj reunites with his father and mother and introduces Paaru.

Cast

 Puneeth Rajkumar as Raaj (Muthuraja)
 Nisha Kothari as Parvathy aka Paaru
 Manju Bhashini
 Rekha Vedavyas in Special Role
 Ramaneetu Chaudhari in Special role
 Mamatha Rao
Aadi Lokesh 
Muni 
Shankar Ashwath 
Kempegowda 
Arasu Maharaj 
Murali Mohan 
Sharan Kabbur 
Mallesh Gowda 
Sathyajith 
Shivaram 
Sharath Lohitashwa 
Mahesh Raj
A. R. Babu 
Umesh Punga 
Shiva Manju 
John 
Mico Nagaraj 
Malavalli Saikrishna 
Dashavara Chandru 
Narasimha Joshi 
Dileep Kumar 
Anand Priya 
Madhugiri Prakash 
Ganesh Rao Kesarkar 
 Jaya Prada as herself
 Urvashi as herself
 Bharathi Vishnuvardhan as herself
 Tulasi Shivamani as Parvathi's Mother 
 Mumaith Khan as special appearance in song

Soundtrack

Production
Raaj The Showman is considered to be a high-budget film in the Kannada film industry.

Reception

Release 

Raaj the Showman was the first Kannada-language film to be simultaneously released worldwide and in India.

Critical response 

A critic from The New Indian Express wrote "Puneet Raj Kumar's brilliant portrayal as Muththuraj is the saving grace. He shows tremendous improvement as an actor and his performance, especially in fight sequences, is certainly a treat to watch. In a way the film belongs to Puneet. The second half deals with how Muththuraj saves Parvathy and realises his dream. In the end, he returns to his village and re-unites with his parents". B S Srivani from Deccan Herald wrote "S Krishna and the DI team provide the right amount of pleasure with their visual efforts. Harikrishna’s music is first class. The supporting cast too is strong. As for the story, well, the treatment is sufficient to make it appear just a few hours old. This showman delivers the goods". A critic from Bangalore Mirror wrote  "Watch the movie for the excellent  cinematography and the music. Prem’s direction is not worth commenting, nor are his efforts at the story and dialogues". Manju Shettar from Mid-Day wrote "Puneeth's acting is not bad and Krishna's cinematography is good. But only two songs are catchy. Nisha Kotari has not done justice to her role. The dialogues and stunts lack freshness".

References

External links 
 

2009 films
2000s Kannada-language films
Films about actors
Films shot in Rajasthan
Films scored by V. Harikrishna
Films shot in Bangalore
Films set in Bangalore
2000s masala films
2009 action drama films
Films about filmmaking
Indian nonlinear narrative films
Indian action drama films
Films directed by Prem